Federal Route 50, or Jalan Batu Pahat–Kluang–Mersing, is a main federal road in Johor, Malaysia. The road connects Batu Pahat in the west to Jemaluang in the east. It is also a main route to North-South Expressway Southern Route via Ayer Hitam Interchange.

Route background
The Kilometre Zero of the Federal Route 50 is located at Batu Pahat near Mount Soga, at its interchange with the Federal Route 5, the main trunk road of the west coast of Peninsular Malaysia.

History
In 1911, the state government of Johor collaborated with the British colonial government to develop a road network from Johor Bahru to Batu Pahat and Muar. As a result, the Batu Pahat–Kluang–Mersing Road was completed in 1919, where the section of the Banang Roundabout to Mount Soga Intersection formed a part of the present-day Federal Route 5.

The road was partially upgraded on 2002 with four-lane carriageway from Batu Pahat to Kluang. The rest of the road remains two lanes.

On 13 January 2007, the Sungai Semberong bridge at Batu 5, Jalan Kluang–Mersing, collapsed during flash floods.

Features
At most sections, the Federal Route 50 was built under the JKR R5 road standard, with a speed limit of 90 km/h.

There are signposts of monkeys and elephants in the Kahang–Kangkar Lenggor–Jemaluang section.

There is an alternative road connecting Kahang and Mersing which runs through Felda Nitar.

List of junctions and towns

References

050